The Dead River (French: Rivière des Morts) is a  river in Marquette County, Michigan. The river flows southeasterly from western Marquette County to its mouth on Lake Superior.

, five dams existed on the river: Silver Lake Dam, Hoist Dam, McClure Dam, Forestville Dam, and Tourist Park Dam. Hoist and McClure are hydroelectric dams. On May 14, 2003, the fuse plug spillway in the Silver Lake Dam failed, unexpectedly releasing nine billion gallons of water to flow down the Dead River. The dam at the Tourist Park failed, but the other upstream dams held. Remarkably, there were no deaths and no major injuries occurred. Property damage was estimated at about $100 million.  The Silver Lake and Tourist Park dams were rebuilt and are now back in operation. 

Historically, its name is derived from the Ojibwe Gaa-waakwimiigong-neyaashi-ziibi (recorded as "Kah way komi gong nay aw shay Sibi", meaning "Peninsula by the Roads to the Land of the Dead River") or Ne-waakwimiinaang (recorded as "Ne ko me non" meaning "by the Peninsula for Road to the Land of the Dead"), both referencing its mouth being near Presque Isle Point, a cape on Lake Superior. Additionally, earlier maps record this river either in French as "Rivière des Morts", "Rivière du Mort", or "Rivière au Paresseux", or in English as "Deadman's River". The current name for this river in Ojibwe is either Giiwe-gamigong-neyaashi-ziibi (Return-by-shore Peninsula River) or Niboowaagaming ("At the Death's Shores").

See also
List of rivers of Michigan

References

Michigan  Streamflow Data from the USGS

Rivers of Michigan
Rivers of Marquette County, Michigan
Tributaries of Lake Superior